Kwanda Dimaza (born ) is a South African rugby union player for the  in the Currie Cup. His regular position is flanker or number 8.

Dimaza was previously named in the  squad for the 2019 Super Rugby season. He joined the  ahead of the newly formed Super Rugby Unlocked competition in October 2020.

References

South African rugby union players
Living people
1997 births
Rugby union flankers
Rugby union number eights
Pumas (Currie Cup) players
Sharks (Currie Cup) players
Sharks (rugby union) players